Pass Creek is a creek located in the Boundary Country region of British Columbia.  This creek flows into the Granby River 11 miles north of Grand Forks, British Columbia. Pass Creek has been mined for gold.

References

External links
 

Rivers of British Columbia